American actor Timothée Chalamet (born December 27, 1995) has received various awards and nominations for his film, television and theatrical performances. His major nominations include an Academy Award, two Golden Globe Awards, three British Academy Film Awards, five Screen Actors Guild Awards, and five Critics' Choice Movie Awards.

After playing minor roles in several films and television shows, Chalamet starred in his first major role as Finn Walden on the television drama series Homeland (2012), for which he was nominated for the Screen Actors Guild Award for Outstanding Performance by an Ensemble in a Drama Series along with the rest of the cast. In 2016, Chalamet starred in John Patrick Shanley's autobiographical play Prodigal Son at Manhattan Theatre Club, for which he was nominated for the Drama League Award for Distinguished Performance and won the Lucille Lortel Award for Outstanding Lead Actor in a Play.

Chalamet's breakthrough role as Elio Perlman in the 2017 acclaimed independent coming-of-age romantic drama Call Me by Your Name earned him an Academy Award nomination for Best Actor, making him the third-youngest nominee in the category and the youngest since 19-year-old Mickey Rooney with his role as Mickey Moran in Babes in Arms in 1939. He was also nominated for the BAFTA Award, Critics' Choice Movie Award, Golden Globe Award, and Screen Actors Guild Award for Best Actor. He won acting awards given by the London Film Critics' Circle, New York Film Critics Circle, Los Angeles Film Critics Association, and National Board of Review.

Chalamet also gained recognition for his supporting roles in the 2017 films Lady Bird and Hostiles. The former earned him nominations for the Critics' Choice Movie Award and the Screen Actors Guild Award for Best Ensemble. The following year, he starred as a drug-addicted teenager in the drama Beautiful Boy, for which he received nominations for the BAFTA Award, Critics' Choice Movie Award, Golden Globe Award, and Screen Actors Guild Award for Best Supporting Actor. In 2021, Chalamet received ensemble nominations for the Screen Actors Guild Award and the Critics’ Choice Movie Award for Outstanding Performance by a Cast in a Motion Picture and Best Cast respectively, for his performance in Don't Look Up.

Awards and nominations

See also 
 List of French Academy Award winners and nominees
 List of Jewish Academy Award winners and nominees
 List of actors with Academy Award nominations

Notes

References

External links
 

Lists of awards received by American actor